"Chuck Versus the Masquerade" is the sixteenth  episode of the fourth season of Chuck. Although taking place on and around Valentine's Day, the episode actually aired originally on February 21, 2011, one week later. Valentine's Day is ruined when the team is dispatched to protect heiress Vivian McArthur (Lauren Cohan). John Casey is tempted by an offer from National Clandestine Service Director Jane Bentley (Robin Givens), and Morgan Grimes makes a big decision.

Plot

Main plot
Former Volkoff Industries operative Boris Kaminsky (David S. Lee) begins a search for a key that can unlock a part of Alexei Volkoff's office to claim the organization. He kills two of Volkoff's lieutenants, leading him to a last one in Volkoff's organization, who tells him that he knows where the key currently is. The lieutenant is spared, but found dead later by the CIA.

Elsewhere, Chuck Bartowski picks his bedroom as Morgan Grimes chooses the living room to spend their Valentine's Day in with their girlfriends. Chuck enters his bedroom and surprises Sarah Walker with a shirt he is wearing, labeling him as a "Love Machine". Before Sarah unveils her own special outfit for Chuck, she tells him to get her chocolate strawberries she made in the kitchen.
Chuck then sneaks out of his room to get it, as Morgan and Alex McHugh (Mekenna Melvin) are performing a spiritual act to feel each other while blindfolded. Chuck declines a phone call from General Beckman as Sarah takes the strawberry bowl from him, getting her dress coat stuck to a hook on the wall. Sarah removes the dress coat and surprises Chuck with a cupid outfit. John Casey arrives and grunts at the sight of both couples in the living room, interrupting Morgan and Alex. As Alex explains herself Casey, Morgan expresses his anger that Chuck and Sarah were in the living room. Casey tells them to leave for a mission immediately.

The team arrives at Castle to find it crowded with agents, whom Beckman reveals are from the NCS to expand the facility. The team is briefed on a mission to arrest Vivian McArthur (Lauren Cohan), who is believed to be Volkoff's chosen successor, in England to protect her from Boris.

The team attends the eponymous masquerade ball at Vivian's manor in England. Chuck and Sarah split to find Vivian as Morgan and Casey are disguised as bartenders. Casey finds a woman who intimidates him by saying that he was born to be an impressive bartender, and Morgan promptly agrees that the drinks he has made are in fact fantastic. Morgan then mocks Casey's position in the team, but Casey backfires it to Morgan, who is feeling irrelevant since Chuck and Sarah are engaged.

Sarah runs into Boris, and they ask each other if they had seen Vivian. Meanwhile, Chuck unknowingly stumbles upon Vivian, who is not quite enjoying the party. The two then converse before Chuck asks if she had seen Vivian, to which she sarcastically responds in third person that no one ever really knows her and that the party was a failed attempt to get to know her neighbors. Sarah meets with Chuck and tells him that Boris is around as Chuck tells Sarah that he just found Vivian. They then head over to Vivian's staple ranch, where she is grooming her horse. Sarah holds Vivian at gunpoint, and confuses her by attempting to arrest her for being an associate of Alexei Volkoff. They are then interrupted when a group of former Volkoff's men attack them. Vivian then tells Sarah that she has nothing to do with Volkoff, as she has not seen him for years. She then reveals that she is Volkoff's daughter and has lived her whole life believing that he was an oil company executive. The team then escapes the manor in one of Vivian's cars and returns to Burbank, CA.

At Castle, the team learns that Vivian is merely a civilian and has nothing to do with her father's notorious organization. She explains that her father had never spent much time with her and kept sending her to more schools than she ever has traveling to other countries with him. Chuck tries to calm Vivian down and tells her that he once used to be like her, dragged into the spy world, but is now content with being a spy. Vivian then proposes to be bait to lure Boris and the other men looking for her, to find out more about the key to Volkoff's office.

The team returns to England, except for Morgan, who is preparing to move out of the apartment with Chuck and Sarah. Sarah poses as Vivian for Vivian's daily morning horse ride. Vivian gives Sarah her necklace from Volkoff to complete her disguise before leaving the manor to lure out the men hunting her. Casey is in position in the forest as a sniper, waiting for Sarah to be tailed. Halfway through the forest, Sarah falls unconscious off the horse when Boris has it panicking. The horse then runs back to the staple ranch where Chuck is waiting with Vivian. The two then ride into the forest on the horse to rescue Sarah as she is being approached by the men. The entire group is sniped away by Casey's sharpshooting skills, saving Sarah before they could kill her.

As Chuck and Vivian ride into the forest on her horse, they are tailed by two other men. Chuck flashes and hangs onto a tree, kicking the two men unconscious off of their horses. Chuck then runs to Casey and Sarah as she asks where Vivian is. Back at the staple ranch, Boris holds Vivian at gunpoint. He asks her for the key, but Vivian is still unaware what or where the key is. Boris then begins intimidating her that despite all the skills, education, and experiences she has, she is still just a weak little girl. Vivian then pulls out a shotgun hidden beside the horse and shoots Boris at point-blank range.

The team comfort Vivian through her first kill as if it was self-defense. As Sarah returns Vivian's necklace, they ask Vivian if she at least now knows where the key is. Vivian looks sharply at her necklace, revealing a locket with the letter "V" on it, and denies knowing where the key is. Casey assures her that Volkoff Industries will not be returning anymore without a leader, as Boris and the other lieutenants have been killed.

Vivian visits the sealed Volkoff Industries headquarters alone and enters Volkoff's office. She finds a horse paperweight marked with the letter "V" and connects the necklace to it, confirming that it is the key. This unlocks a secret compartment in Volkoff's office.

The Woodcombs
Devon and Ellie Woodcomb experience an incredible amount of stress handling their baby. While at the Buy More, the two find out that Clara would not stop crying until she is comforted by Rusted Root's song "Send Me On My Way" playing in a teddy bear belonging to Jeff Barnes and Lester Patel. Ellie distracts Jeff and Lester, while Devon steals their teddy bear. They keep Clara comforted with the song playing in the teddy bear, but soon find that the song keeps them awake. They put her in her own room, as she is already three months old, and Morgan gives her his childhood Star Wars collectibles that he bought with Chuck.

Morgan and Casey

Throughout the episode, both Morgan and Casey display a strong feeling of being left out. While Morgan feels irrelevant as Chuck and Sarah are engaged, Casey feels left out as he has been put to serve as bartenders and paperwork. Morgan decides to move out from Echo Park, as he feels that Chuck and Sarah deserve their own home. After a conversation where Chuck and Morgan discuss splitting the various collectibles the two collected since childhood, in which Han Solo and Chewbacca collectibles are used as a metaphor for their friendship, Morgan decides to give the collectibles to Clara to keep them in the family.

Meanwhile, Casey is persuaded by Jane Bentley (Robin Givens), director of the CIA's NCS and the woman who complimented his skills as a bartender, to lead a new team based in Burbank. The NCS remains at Castle for several days and begins expanding the facility. Bentley tempts Casey to join the NCS, as he joined the NSA as the best sharpshooter in America, and is now serving in Team Bartowski disguising as bartenders, waiters, and doing paperwork. A sojourning transient for most of his adult life, Casey reveals that he has now put down roots by declining Bentley's offer on the basis of not wanting to leave Burbank. Bentley, however, explains that the assignment will be in Burbank and shows Casey an entrance to a new part of Castle, restricted to only NCS staff.

Production
It was announced in February 2011 that the episode would mark the first appearance of Lauren Cohan and Robin Givens in their recurring roles of Vivian McArthur and Jane Bentley, respectively. It was originally to be titled as "Chuck Versus the First Mate". When Morgan looks through his old stuff before moving out, one of the earliest promotional photographs, released prior to the pilot episode, is seen, depicting Chuck and Morgan.

Continuity
 Clara Woodcomb is stated to be three months old. However, if the date of the episode is Valentine's Day, this would have placed her birth near the events of "Chuck Versus the Leftovers".
 Clara seems to like the same music as her father; Devon mentions in "Chuck Versus the Push Mix" that his favorite band is Rusted Root.

Flashes
 Chuck flashes on gymnastics to unhorse two of Kaminsky's men.

Cultural references
 Chuck plans to watch Love Actually.
 Chuck and Vivian both compare the masquerade to Eyes Wide Shut.
 Chuck directly quotes and cites Vivian Ward (Julia Roberts) in Pretty Woman.
 Morgan uses Han Solo and Chewbacca toys as a metaphor for his friendship with Chuck.
 The scene where Morgan gives his toys to Ellie for Clara's room alludes to Toy Story 3.

Reception
"Chuck Versus the Masquerade" received mixed reviews from critics. HitFix writer Alan Sepinwall wrote that the episode was "a much denser episode of 'Chuck' than we often get, and one that handled almost all of its assignments superbly. Lots going on, but it didn't feel too busy." Sepinwall also found that "the Morgan end of things was even more fun, starting with that hilarious glimpse of Morgan and Alex 'transferring energy' while a baffled and scared Chuck and Sarah watched, then going on to Sarah trying to have a playdate with Morgan..., followed by some serious bromantice moments for Chuck (who has dressed as Han Solo, at least in a CIA-manufactured photo) and Morgan (who is furry enough, but not tall enough, to pass for Chewbacca). However, Steve Heisler of The A.V. Club gave the episode a D, criticizing its horseback riding scene and writing, "'Chuck Versus The Masquerade' was one of the most forgettable episodes in Chuck's history, and it exemplifies everything that is wrong with this show. Remember how everyone used to hate Chuck during season two, but we loyal viewers were all like 'You just don't get it, maaaaaaan' [snaps fingers whilst wearing a beret(s)]? This episode is everything they were talking about, only now the call is coming from inside the house."

Eric Goldman of IGN gave this episode a score of 9 out of 10, finding Cohan's performance "impressive". Goldman also commented on the episode's subplot, writing that "the angst between Chuck and Morgan was both sweet and funny, including the integral use of their Han Solo and Chewbacca toys as a metaphor for their friendship." Goldman concluded, "All in all, this was a jam-packed, exciting episode that built towards a cool conclusion and looks to be setting the stage for some big events to come."

The episode drew 5.48 million viewers.

References

External links
 

Masquerade
2011 American television episodes
Television episodes written by Rafe Judkins